"We Belong" is a 1984 song by Pat Benatar.

We Belong may also refer to:

 "We Belong" (Sheppard song), 2016
 "We Belong", a 2020 song by Dove Cameron

See also
 
 We Belong Together (disambiguation)